Volunteer is the sixth studio album by folk band Old Crow Medicine Show. It was released in April 2018 by Columbia Nashville. The album is the band's only one to feature Joe Andrews, who plays on every track and subsequently became a full band member. It is the last album to feature founding members Kevin Hayes and Critter Fuqua as well as Chance McCoy, all of whom departed the group prior to the release of their next album Paint This Town.

Critical reception

The album received a Metacritic score of 85 based on 6 critics, indicating universal acclaim.

Commercial performance
The album debuted at No. 14 on Top Country Albums, No. 1 on  Bluegrass Albums, and No. 7 on Americana/Folk Albums, with 7,000 equivalent album units (6,500 in traditional album sales) in its first week. It is Old Crow Medicine Show's seventh No. 1 on the Bluegrass Albums chart, tying with Ricky Skaggs and Rhonda Vincent for the most No. 1s in the history of chart. It has sold 11,500 copies in the United States as of June 2018.

Track listing

Personnel
Ketch Secor - Vocals, fiddle, harmonica, resophonic plectrum, banjo, guitar.
Critter Fuqua - Acoustic, electric and slide guitars, banjo, vocals, drums.
Chance McCoy - Acoustic, 12 string, classical and electric guitars, vocals, fiddle.
Cory Younts - Mandolin, vocals, drums, percussion, piano.
Kevin Hayes - Guitjo, lead vocal on track 7.
Morgan Jahnig - Bass, baritone guitar, vocals.
Joe Andrews - Ukulele, banjo, mandolin, pedal steel, guitar, vocals.
Dave Cobb - Percussion tracks 2 and 3, guitar tracks 5 and 9.

Charts

References

2018 albums
ATO Records albums
Old Crow Medicine Show albums